Maksis is a Latvian masculine given name and may refer to:
Maksis Kazāks (1912–1983), Latvian basketball player
Maksis Lazersons (1887–1951), Latvian politician, jurist and philosopher
Maksis Reiters (1886–1950), Latvian-Soviet military commander

References

Latvian masculine given names